Madabhavi  is a large village located in Athani taaluk of Belagavi district, Karnataka state of India. The village is famous for the production of leather chappals, which have main market in Kolhapur. The village name comes from "Madya" meaning central and "Bhavi" meaning an open well. The open well is situated near panchayat of the village. Kalbhairava and Madhukeshwar are two ancient temples in this village.

History
Madbhavi, previously known as Pattan Madbhavi, was the princely state ruled by the Desai family. There was rebellion during the 16th-17th centuries, as a result one of the branch of the royal family was expelled from the kingdom. The expelled family branch then headed to west and acquired the royal title of PATIL. The present population of the same branch of then 4 brothers with one unmarried SISTER "PADMATI" Lives in 3 villages i.e. CHINCHWAD, VASAGADE & MADABHAVI. 
The village was ruled under Jath State (Jath was the former capital of Jath State, one of the non-salute Maratha princely states of British India, under the Bombay Presidency, and later the Deccan States Agency. It was a southern Maratha Jagir).

Geography
The surrounding nearby villages and its distance from Madhabhavi are 
Jambagi-6.5 km, Aralihatti-7.1 km, Muragundi-7.8 km, Kempawad-7.9 km, Sambaragi-9.3 km, Mole-10.3 km, Tangadi-11.1 km, Mangasuli-11.4 km, Parthanahalli-14.0 km, Khelegaon (Khilegavi)-15.0 km, Gundewadi-15.0 km, Hulagabali-16.2 km, Ainapur-16.7 km, Sankonatti-16.9 km, Ananthpur-17.9 km, Krishna Kittur-18.6 km, Halyal-18.7 km, Malabad-19.2 km, Darur-19.9 km, Balligeri-20.6 km, Ugar B K-21.4 km, Naganur P K-23.3 km, Kusnal-26.2 km, Kohalli-27.2 km, Kagawad-27.6 km, Adahalli-27.9 km, Shegunashi-28.3 km, Satti-29.3 km.

Demographics
Population
 In Madabhavi village population of children with age 0-6 is 1067 which makes up 13.14% of total population of village. Average Sex Ratio of Madabhavi village is 946 which is lower than Karnataka state average of 973. Child Sex Ratio for the Madabhavi as per census is 947, lower than Karnataka average of 948. Population with total 1619 families residing in village has population of 8119 of which 4172 are males while 3947 are females as per Population Census 2011.

Education and Language
 Madabhavi village has lower literacy rate compared to Karnataka. In 2011, literacy rate of Madabhavi village was 65.95% compared to 75.36% of Karnataka. In Madabhavi Male literacy stands at 73.43% while female literacy rate was 58.05%. Village have educational institutions like SGS College, madabhavi and Primary Govt School in Kannada and Marathi medium. Official language is Kannada most of people speak Kannada, due to border place near to Maharashtra Marathi also speak some people can speak English.

Employment
 Village people mainly depend on agriculture along with the leather industry. The village is famous for leather chappals. The scheduled caste families form considerable chunk of the local population. This deserves a special mention because of the major contribution of few sub-groups to the now-famous leather products of Athani. The sub-groups are Dhors and Samagars who are mostly engaged in this leather trade and are traditional leather workers. Dhors are specialized in tanning of hides and skins, while Samagars have proved as intricate craftsmen to produce leather foot wears. Recognizing this, the Khadi and village industries commission established a footwear manufacturing centre under the name "Charmalaya". The success of this paved the way towards another milestone, where ‘Lidkar’ backed by the State Government, saw the light of the day, boosting the activity of footwear manufacturing further. The foot-wears are marketed throughout India by the respective outlets. The traders from other part of the country also procure leather goods from village, to market them in their areas. Through the State Trading Corporation, these leather goods are also exported to many countries where they have found a sizeable market. The category which has established itself by way of its design and quality is known as ‘Kolhapuri Chappals’ which has a great demand in local as well as the export markets.. These goods were exported to foreign countries like Scotland, Netherlands, England and others.

Market
 On every Thursday (ಗುರುವಾರ) village level market is takes place in central place of village. Day today life goods are exchange in market. Agriculture products sell here.

Education 
Madabhavi village has lower literacy rate compared to Karnataka. In 2011, literacy rate of Madabhavi village was 65.95% compared to 75.36% of Karnataka. In Madabhavi Male literacy stands at 73.43% while female literacy rate was 58.05%. 
Village have educational institutions like SGS College, madabhavi and Primary Govt School in Kannada and Marathi medium.

Temples
 Shri Siddeswar Temple is big temple in the village. Every year on Vaishaka amavasya (ಅಕ್ಷತದಿಗಿ) its fair will takes place. Thousands of people gather.
 Other temples are Hanuman temple, Bhireswara temple and shanishwar temple others.
oldest Ancients temples Madhukeshwar temple, Kalbhairava Temple
Basavanna Temple is located on Madbhavi -Kempawad road.

Transportation
Railway
 Miraj Junction railway station is an important railway station near to village located at distance of 42 km.
 Shedbal railway station is located at a distance of 30 km.

Roadway
 Athani is taaluka place located at a distance of 16 km. Village is located 132 km towards North from District headquarters Belgaum. 582 km from State capital Bangalore. 
Near by cities are  
Athani; Miraj; Jaysingpur; Sangli; Vijayapura (Bijapur);Pandharpur; Solapur and Kolhapur.

See also
 Belagavi

External links
 Belagavi district official site
 2011 Census

Villages in Belagavi district